Norman Gilbert Pritchard (23 June 1875 – 30 October 1929), also known by his stage name Norman Trevor, was a British-Indian athlete and actor who became the first Asian-born athlete to win an Olympic medal when he won two silver medals in athletics at the 1900 Paris Olympics representing India. He won India's first medal at the Olympics in the 200 metres and the 200 metres hurdles.

Biography
Norman Pritchard was born in Calcutta to George Petersen Pritchard and Helen Maynard Pritchard.

Norman Pritchard was the first Indian athlete to participate in the Olympic Games and was also the first to win an Olympic medal and also represent an Asian nation. He won two silver medals at the 1900 Summer Olympics in Paris, coming second in the 200 metres behind Walter Tewksbury of the United States and second in the 200 metres hurdles behind the legendary Alvin Kraenzlein, also of the United States. He reached the final of the 110 metres hurdles, but did not finish, and also participated in the 60 metres and 100 metres sprints, in which he failed to qualify for the finals.

In 2005 the IAAF published the official track and field statistics for the 2004 Summer Olympics. In the historical records section Pritchard was listed as having competed for Great Britain in 1900. Research by Olympic historians has shown that Pritchard was indeed chosen to represent Great Britain after competing in the British AAA championship in June 1900. However, the IOC still regard Pritchard as having competed for India, and his two medals are credited to India.

Pritchard won the Bengal province 100 yards sprint title for seven consecutive years, from 1894 to 1900 and set a meet record in 1898–99. He also won the 440 yards (¼ mile) run and the 120 yards hurdles.

He studied at St. Xavier's College, Calcutta, and is credited with the first hat-trick in an open football tournament in India, for Saint Xavier's against Sovabazar in July 1897.

He served as Secretary of the Indian Football Association from 1900 to 1902. He moved permanently to Britain in 1905.

He then moved to the United States to pursue a career in acting and became the first Olympian to act in silent Hollywood movies under the screen name, Norman Trevor.

Death
He died in Los Angeles of a brain malady on 30 October 1929.

Selected filmography

 The Ivory Snuff Box (1915)
 The Daughter Pays (1920)
 Romance (1920)
 The Black Panther's Cub (1921)
 Jane Eyre (1921)
 The Side Show of Life (1924)
 Roulette (1924)
 Wages of Virtue (1924)
 The Man Who Found Himself (1925)
 Dancing Mothers (1926)
 The Ace of Cads (1926)
 The Song and Dance Man (1926)
 Beau Geste (1926)
 The Warning (1927)
 New York (1927)
 Afraid to Love (1927)
 The Wizard (1927)
 The Music Master (1927)
 Children of Divorce (1927)
 Sorrell and Son (1927)
 The Siren (1927)
 Mad Hour (1928)
 Restless Youth (1928)
 The Love Trap (1929)

See also
India at the Summer Olympics

References

External links
 

 
 
 With Florence Reed and Earle Foxe in The Black Panther's Cub (1921)
 Norman Trevor, 1927 portrait (archived)
 The search for India's first Olympic medallist Sports journalist Gulu Ezekiel's article on BBC News website.

1875 births
1929 deaths
People from British India
Athletes from Kolkata
English male sprinters
Indian male sprinters
English male hurdlers
Indian male hurdlers
Olympic athletes of India
Olympic silver medalists for India
Athletes (track and field) at the 1900 Summer Olympics
English male stage actors
English male film actors
English male silent film actors
20th-century English male actors
University of Calcutta alumni
Medalists at the 1900 Summer Olympics
Olympic silver medalists in athletics (track and field)
British people in colonial India